Kibergsneset (also spelled Kibergneset) is a peninsula in Vardø Municipality in Finnmark county, Norway. The small peninsula is located on the larger Varanger Peninsula along the Barents Sea.

There is a coastal fortress on the southeastern part of the peninsula.  It was built by the occupying Germans during World War II.  Kibergsneset is the easternmost point of mainland Norway.

References

Vardø
Peninsulas of Troms og Finnmark